The World against Violence and Extremism (acronym WAVE) is a conference proposed by Iranian President Hassan Rouhani. The United Nations voted approve President Rouhani's WAVE proposal at a general assembly in December, 2013 which resulted in a call for all nations across the globe to denounce violence and extremism.

In December, 2014, Tehran held a 2-day WAVE conference with representatives from more than 40 countries. This conference was referred to as, "the beginning of a new international coalition against extremism."

See also
Dialogue Among Civilizations

References

Politics of Iran
Extremism
Hassan Rouhani
Political neologisms